Mengho Fakir Shar مینگھو فقیر شر is a village of Thari Mirwah Tehsil in district Khairpur. The village is named after the poet Mengho Fakir Shar, who was the son of Mystic poet Ghulam Hyder Godrya Fakir. The village is 60km south of the district headquarters, Khairpur, and approximately 430km north of Karachi. It has almost 500 houses and a population of between 1800 and 2000 people.

Populated places in Khairpur District
Thari Mirwah